
Year 642 (DCXLII) was a common year starting on Tuesday (link will display the full calendar) of the Julian calendar. The denomination 642 for this year has been used since the early medieval period, when the Anno Domini calendar era became the prevalent method in Europe for naming years.

Events 
 By place  

 Byzantine Empire 
 Emperor Constans II marries Fausta.

 Europe 
 April 30 – Chindasuinth, a Gothic warlord (already 79 years old), commences a rebellion and deposes King Tulga in Toledo, Spain. He is proclaimed king by the Visigothic nobility and anointed by the bishops. Tulga is tonsured and sent out to live his days in a monastery.
 Radulf, a Frankish aristocrat, revolts against King Sigebert III of Austrasia and defeats his army, taking the title of rex or king of Thuringia.

 Britain 
 August 5 – Battle of Maserfield: King Penda of Mercia defeats and kills King Oswald of Northumbria, age 38, at Oswestry (West Midlands). He commands a united British and Mercian force, which includes the Welsh army of Kings Cadafael Cadomedd of Gwynedd and Cynddylan of Pengwern. The Mercians become dominant in the English Midlands.
 Oswiu succeeds his half-brother Oswald as king of Bernicia. He strengthens his position by marrying Eanflæd, daughter of King Edwin of Northumbria, then in exile in the Kingdom of Kent. This marriage takes place between 642 and 644.

 Persia 
 Battle of Nahāvand: The Rashidun army (30,000 men) under Sa`d ibn Abi Waqqas defeats the Persians at Nahāvand (modern Iran). The Persian cavalry, full of confidence, mounts an ill-prepared attack. The Arabs retreat to a safe area, where they outmanoeuvre and destroy the Persians in a narrow mountain valley.

 Africa 
 Battle of Dongola: 'Amr ibn al-'As sends an Arab expedition of 20,000 horsemen, under his cousin Uqba ibn Nafi, to Makuria (Southern Egypt). The Nubians strike hard against the Muslims near Dongola with hit-and-run attacks. The Arab incursions into Nubia are temporarily halted.

 Asia 
 Emperor Taizong of the Tang Dynasty issues a decree throughout China, that increases the punishment for men who deliberately inflict injuries upon themselves (most commonly breaking their own legs) in order to avoid military conscription. This decree is an effort to eradicate this practice that has grown as a trend since the time of the rebellion against the Sui Dynasty.
 Taizong supports a revolt by Turkic tribes against the rebellious Tu-lu Qaghan of the Western Turkic Khaganate.
 Empress Kōgyoku ascends to the throne of Japan, after her husband (and uncle) Emperor Jomei's death in 641.
 Winter – Yeon Gaesomun seizes power over Goguryeo (Korea), and places King Bojang on the throne.

 By topic 

 Arts and sciences 
 The earliest surviving dated Arabic-language papyrus (PERF 558), found in Heracleopolis (Egypt), and the earliest known Arabic text with diacritical marks is written.

 Architecture 
 Arabs begin construction of the Mosque of Amr at Cairo, the first mosque built in Egypt and in all of Africa.

 Religion 
 October 12 – Pope John IV dies after a 2-year reign. He is succeeded by a Jerusalem-born cleric of Greek descent, Theodore I, as the 73rd pope of Rome.
 A monastic settlement is founded in Hampshire (England) which later becomes Winchester Cathedral.

Births 
 Ceolfrith, Anglo-Saxon abbot (approximate date)
 Hasan al-Basri, Arab theologian (d. 728)
 Julian, archbishop of Toledo (d. 690)
 Máel Ruba, Irish abbot (d. 722)
 Mujahid ibn Jabr, Muslim scholar (or 645)

Deaths 
 August 5 or 641 – Oswald, king of Northumbria
 October 12 – Pope John IV
 Emma, Anglo-Saxon queen
 Eowa, king of Mercia (English Midlands)
 Domnall Brecc, king of Dál Riata
 Domnall mac Áedo, high king of Ireland
 Flaochad, Mayor of the Palace (Burgundy)
 Heraklonas, Byzantine emperor (approximate date)
 Khalid ibn al-Walid, Arab general (b. 592)
 Mardanshah, Persian general
 Nanthild, Frankish queen
 Pulakeshin II, king of Chalukya (India)
 Willibad, patrician (of duke) of Burgundy
 Yeongnyu, king of Goguryeo (Korea)
 Yuwen Shiji, chancellor of the Tang Dynasty

References

Sources